KITSAT-2 (a.k.a. "Uribyol 2", "KITSAT-OSCAR 25", "KO-25" and "KITSAT-B") was a South Korean experimental Earth observation microsatellite. KITSAT-2 was South Korea's second satellite and was the first to be developed and manufactured domestically by the Korea Advanced Institute of Science (KAIST).

Launch 
The satellite was launched into orbit on 26 September 1993, at 01:45 UTC, on the 59th flight of the Ariane-40 H10 launch vehicle. The launch took place in the Centre Spatial Guyanais, French Guiana. KITSAT-2 was a South Korean microsatellite that was launched along with SPOT-3. Its mission was very similar to PoSAT-1 (1993-061D).

Mission 
The satellite's mission was to improve and enhance the KITSAT-1 systems, use domestically manufactured components, demonstrate experimental modules and to promote domestic space industry.

See also 

 KITSAT-1
 KITSAT-3
 PSLV-C2

References 

Satellites orbiting Earth
Satellites of South Korea
Spacecraft launched in 1993
Amateur radio satellites